Quzlijeh may refer to:
 Quzlijeh, Hamadan
 Quzlijeh, Razan, Hamadan Province